The Cal/EPA Building is a 25-floor, 372 ft commercial office skyscraper in Downtown Sacramento that serves as the headquarters for the California Environmental Protection Agency (Cal/EPA). It also known as the Joe Serna Jr. Building, named to honor the late mayor of Sacramento, Joe Serna Jr. Built in 2000, the building stands 372 feet tall and sits across the street from Cesar Chavez Plaza and Sacramento City Hall. It has a daily population of 3,500. It is recognized by the United States Environmental Protection Agency as one of the most energy-efficient high-rise office buildings in the United States, with a score of 96 out of 100. In 2003, it was recognized by Energy Star as the most energy-efficient high-rise in the nation. Solar panels are installed that generate electricity soundlessly for the building.

See also 

 California Environmental Protection Agency
 List of tallest buildings in Sacramento

References 

Office buildings completed in 2000
Skyscraper office buildings in Sacramento, California
Government buildings in California